Sin Da-Woon (Hangul: 신다운, born 5 March 1993) is a South Korean short track speed skater. He won two distances and the overall classification at the 2013 World Short Track Speed Skating Championships.

External links
Sin Da-Woon from ShorttrackOnLine.info
Sin Da-Woon from BEST sports

1993 births
Living people
South Korean male short track speed skaters
Olympic short track speed skaters of South Korea
Short track speed skaters at the 2014 Winter Olympics
Asian Games silver medalists for South Korea
Asian Games medalists in short track speed skating
Short track speed skaters at the 2017 Asian Winter Games
Medalists at the 2017 Asian Winter Games
World Short Track Speed Skating Championships medalists
South Korean sportspeople in doping cases
Doping cases in short track speed skating
21st-century South Korean people